Merete Møller (born 7 May 1978 in Sønderborg) is a former Danish handball player and World champion. She was part of the team that won the 1997 World Championship.

External links
 profile at eurohandball.com 

1978 births
Living people
Danish female handball players
People from Sønderborg
Sportspeople from the Region of Southern Denmark